The Sfatul Țării Palace is a building in Chișinău, Moldova.

Overview 
The building is located near Central Chișinău. It served as a meeting place for the Sfatul Țării, the assembly which proclaimed the independence of the Moldavian Democratic Republic in 1917 then union with Romania in 1918. The building was heavily damaged in the Second World War. It is currently home to the Academy of Music, Theatre and Fine Arts.

Gallery

See also 
 Capitoline Wolf, Chişinău

References
Alexei Mateevici, 111. Clădirea fostului gimnaziu nr.3 pentru băieți în care, în martie 1918 și-aținut ședințele Sfatul Țări
Sfatul țării, locul unde s-a votat Unirea din 1918 (Chișinău)

Notes

Buildings and structures in Chișinău
Government buildings completed in 1905
Moldavian Democratic Republic
1905 establishments in the Russian Empire